The 2013 WNBA season is the 8th season for the Chicago Sky of the Women's National Basketball Association.

With the addition of Elena Delle Donne, expectations were high for the Sky to finally reach the playoffs. Delle Donne, along with Sylvia Fowles, Epiphanny Prince, Courtney Vandersloot, and Swin Cash finished the regular season with the best record in the Eastern Conference - thus giving the Sky, their first regular season Conference title and the first seed in the 2013 WNBA Playoffs. The Sky were ultimately swept in the Conference Semifinals by the Indiana Fever.

Transactions

WNBA Draft

Trades and Roster Changes

Roster
{| class="toccolours" style="font-size: 95%; width: 100%;"
|-
! colspan="2"  style="background:#4b90cc; color:#Fbb726"|2013 Chicago Sky Roster
|- style="text-align:center; background-color:#Fbb726; color:#FFFFFF;"
! Players !! Coaches
|-
| valign="top" |
{| class="sortable" style="background:transparent; margin:0px; width:100%;"
! Pos. !! # !! Nat. !! Name !! Ht. !! Wt. !! From
|-

Depth

Schedule

Preseason

|- style="background:#cfc;"
| 1
| May 15
| New York
| 
| Elena Delle Donne (17)
| Sylvia Fowles (7)
| Sharnee Zoll (7)
| Dickens Athletic Center  1,250
| 1-0
|-

Regular Season

|- style="background:#cfc;"
| 1
| May 27
| @ Phoenix
| 
| Epiphanny Prince (26)
| Sylvia Fowles (10)
| Epiphanny Prince (5)
| US Airways Center10,200
| 1–0
|- style="background:#cfc;"
| 2
| May 31
|  Connecticut
| 
| Sylvia Fowles (24)
| Sylvia Fowles (22)
| Courtney Vandersloot (7)
| Allstate Arena6,607
| 2–0
|-

|- style="background:#cfc;"
| 3
| June 2
|  Tulsa
| 
| Epiphanny Prince (19)
| Sylvia Fowles (13)
| Swin Cash (5)
| Allstate Arena6,811
| 3–0
|- style="background:#fcc;"
| 4
| June 7
| @ San Antonio
| 
| Elena Delle Donne (17)
| Sylvia Fowles (13)
| CashZoll (3)
| AT&T Center6,244
| 3–1
|- style="background:#cfc;"
| 5
| June 9
|  San Antonio
| 
| Elena Delle Donne (23)
| Sylvia Fowles (16)
| Courtney Vandersloot (5)
| Allstate Arena4,293
| 4–1
|- style="background:#fcc;"
| 6
| June 16
| @ Atlanta
| 
| Elena Delle Donne (25)
| Sylvia Fowles (10)
| Courtney Vandersloot (7)
| Philips Arena5,552
| 4–2
|- style="background:#fcc;"
| 7
| June 20
| @ Tulsa
| 
| Sylvia Fowles (17)
| Sylvia Fowles (12)
| Courtney Vandersloot (5)
| BOK Center4,161
| 4–3
|- style="background:#cfc;"
| 8
| June 22
| @ Indiana
| 
| Epiphanny Prince (21)
| Swin Cash (8)
| Courtney Vandersloot (4)
| Bankers Life Fieldhouse7,934
| 5–3
|- style="background:#cfc;"
| 9
| June 26
|  NY Liberty
| 
| Elena Delle Donne (26)
| Sylvia Fowles (14)
| Elena Delle Donne (6)
| Allstate Arena8,911
| 6–3
|- style="background:#cfc;"
| 10
| June 29
|  Los Angeles
| 
| Epiphanny Prince (21)
| Elena Delle Donne (8)
| Courtney Vandersloot (4)
| Allstate Arena6,885
| 7–3
|-

|- style="background:#fcc;"
| 11
| July 2
|  Seattle
| 
| PrinceDelle Donne (12)
| Swin Cash (14)
| Courtney Vandersloot (3)
| Allstate Arena5,808
| 7–4
|- style="background:#cfc;"
| 12
| July 7
| @ NY Liberty
| 
| Elena Delle Donne (20)
| Carolyn Swords (7)
| Courtney Vandersloot (3)
| Prudential Center7,127
| 8–4
|- style="background:#cfc;"
| 13
| July 10
|  Washington
| 
| Sylvia Fowles (26)
| Sylvia Fowles (18)
| Courtney Vandersloot (6)
| Allstate Arena14,201
| 9–4
|- style="background:#cfc;"
| 14
| July 12
| @ Connecticut
| 
| Elena Delle Donne (23)
| CashFowles (8)
| Courtney Vandersloot (7)
| Mohegan Sun Arena6,285
| 10–4
|- style="background:#cfc;"
| 15
| July 18
| @ NY Liberty
| 
| Elena Delle Donne (23)
| Delle DonnePrinceYoung (6)
| Courtney Vandersloot (8)
| Prudential Center12,858
| 11–4
|- style="background:#cfc;"
| 16
| July 20
|  NY Liberty
| 
| Tamera Young (17)
| Sylvia Fowles (13)
| Courtney Vandersloot (9)
| Allstate Arena6,037
| 12–4
|- style="background:#fcc;"
| 17
| July 24
| @ Washington
| 
| Sylvia Fowles (21)
| Sylvia Fowles (9)
| Courtney Vandersloot (4)
| Verizon Center14,411
| 12–5
|-

|- align="center"
|colspan="9" bgcolor="#bbcaff"|All-Star Break
|- style="background:#cfc;"
| 18
| August 2
|  Washington
| 
| Sylvia Fowles (32)
| Sylvia Fowles (15)
| Courtney Vandersloot (9)
| Allstate Arena5,134
| 13–5
|- style="background:#fcc;"
| 19
| August 3
| @ Indiana
| 
| Courtney Vandersloot (11)
| Avery Warley (8)
| CashPrince (2)
| Bankers Life Fieldhouse8,610
| 13–6
|- style="background:#fcc;"
| 20
| August 6
|  Indiana
| 
| Sylvia Fowles (14)
| Sylvia Fowles (17)
| PrinceVandersloot (3)
| Allstate Arena4,135
| 13–7
|- style="background:#cfc;"
| 21
| August 9
| @ Connecticut
| 
| Epiphanny Prince (23)
| Sylvia Fowles (10)
| Epiphanny Prince (4)
| Mohegan Sun Arena6,086
| 14–7
|- style="background:#cfc;"
| 22
| August 11
|  Minnesota
| 
| Elena Delle Donne (32)
| Sylvia Fowles (9)
| Courtney Vandersloot (9)
| Allstate Arena6,297
| 15–7
|- style="background:#fcc;"
| 23
| August 13
| @ Los Angeles
| 
| Sylvia Fowles (22)
| Sylvia Fowles (9)
| Courtney Vandersloot (6)
| Staples Center10,553
| 15–8
|- style="background:#cfc;"
| 24
| August 15
| @ Seattle
| 
| Swin Cash (18)
| Sylvia Fowles (10)
| Courtney Vandersloot (8)
| Key Arena6,829
| 16–8
|- style="background:#cfc;"
| 25
| August 18
|  Connecticut
| 
| Epiphanny Prince (21)
| Sylvia Fowles (21)
| Epiphanny Prince (8)
| Allstate Arena5,074
| 17–8
|- style="background:#cfc;"
| 26
| August 20
| @ Washington
| 
| Elena Delle Donne (24)
| Sylvia Fowles (15)
| Courtney Vandersloot (7)
| Verizon Center6,471
| 18–8
|- style="background:#cfc;"
| 27
| August 23
|  NY Liberty
| 
| Sylvia Fowles (14)
| FowlesCampbellWarley (7)
| Courtney Vandersloot (7)
| Allstate Arena5,888
| 19–8
|- style="background:#cfc;"
| 28
| August 24
| @ Atlanta
| 
| Elena Delle Donne (25)
| Sylvia Fowles (13)
| Courtney Vandersloot (10)
| Philips Arena7,412
| 20–8
|- style="background:#cfc;"
| 29
| August 31
|  Atlanta
| 
| Sylvia Fowles (18)
| Delle DonneWarley (7)
| Courtney Vandersloot (9)
| Allstate Arena6,047
| 21–8
|-

|- style="background:#fcc;"
| 30
| September 6
|  Indiana
| 
| Sylvia Fowles (23)
| Tamera Young (10)
| Swin Cash (4)
| Allstate Arena5,996
| 21–9
|- style="background:#cfc;"
| 31
| September 8
| @ Washington
| 
| Elena Delle Donne (22)
| Sylvia Fowles (9)
| Courtney Vandersloot (6)
| Verizon Center9,060
| 22–9
|- style="background:#cfc;"
| 32
| September 11
|  Phoenix
| 
| Epiphanny Prince (21)
| Sylvia Fowles (12)
| Courtney Vandersloot (6)
| Allstate Arena6,409
| 23–9
|- style="background:#cfc;"
| 33
| September 13
|  Atlanta
| 
| Epiphanny Prince (29)
| Sylvia Fowles (18)
| Epiphanny Prince (7)
| Allstate Arena7,679
| 24–9
|- style="background:#fcc;"
| 34
| September 14
| @ Minnesota
| 
| Sylvia Fowles (17)
| Sylvia Fowles (11)
| Swin Cash (6)
| Target Center9,613
| 24–10
|-

Playoffs

|- style="background:#fcc;"
| 1
| September 20
|  Indiana
| 
| Elena Delle Donne (20)
| Sylvia Fowles (10)
| Courtney Vandersloot (7)
| Allstate Arena5895
| 0–1
|- style="background:#fcc;"
| 2
| September 22
| @ Indiana
| 
| Sylvia Fowles (14)
| Sylvia Fowles (14)
| Vandersloot & Delle Donne (2)
| Bankers Life Fieldhouse7144
| 0–2
|-

Standings

Playoffs

Statistics

Regular Season

Playoffs

Awards and Honors

References

External links

Chicago Sky seasons
Chicago
Chicago Sky